In the 1969–70 season, USM Alger is competing in the Nationale I for the 4th season, as well as the Maghreb Cup Winners Cup, the Algerian Cup. They will be competing in Championnat National, the Maghreb Cup Winners Cup and the Algerian Cup. In the Maghreb Cup Winners Cup and in his first participation, USM Alger managed to reach the final, where he was defeated against the Moroccan landowner RS Settat the champion of Coupe du Trône with a single goal, In the Algerian Cup the club reached the final for the second time in a row against the same team CR Belcourt. Like the first final the two teams after a draw The match was replayed and where ending in a 4–1 victory to CR Belcourt again.

Squad list
Players and squad numbers last updated on 1 September 1969.Note: Flags indicate national team as has been defined under FIFA eligibility rules. Players may hold more than one non-FIFA nationality.

Pre-season and friendlies

Competitions

Overview

Nationale I

League table

Results by round

Matches

Algerian Cup

Maghreb Cup Winners Cup

Squad information

Playing statistics

|-

Goalscorers
Includes all competitive matches. The list is sorted alphabetically by surname when total goals are equal.

References

USM Alger seasons
Algerian football clubs 1969–70 season